Péter Módos (born 17 December 1987 in Szigetvár) is a Hungarian wrestler. He won the bronze medal at the 2012 Summer Olympics in the Greco-Roman men's 55 kg event.

External links

sports-reference.com

References

Hungarian male sport wrestlers
1989 births
Living people
Olympic wrestlers of Hungary
Wrestlers at the 2012 Summer Olympics
Olympic bronze medalists for Hungary
Olympic medalists in wrestling
Medalists at the 2012 Summer Olympics
World Wrestling Championships medalists
Sportspeople from Baranya County
21st-century Hungarian people